Aimery VI (died 1388), Viscount of Narbonne and Lord of Puisserguier, was a 14th-century French noble. He was an Admiral of France from 1369 to 1373.

References
Claude Devic, Joseph Vaissète, Ernest Roschach. Histoire générale de Languedoc. 1885.

1388 deaths
Viscounts of Narbonne
Year of birth unknown